Nicolás Sarmiento (born 3 December 1992) is an Argentine professional futsal player who plays as a Goalkeeper for Spanish club Real Betis in the Spanish Primera División and the Argentine national futsal team.

In 2016, he won the FIFA Futsal World Cup and was awarded the competition's Golden Glove. He won the FIFA Futsal World Cup Golden Glove again in 2021, but lost in the final with Argentina.

Honours

National team
FIFA Futsal World Cup: 2016
Copa América de Futsal: 2022

Individual
FIFA Futsal World Cup Golden Glove: 2016
FIFA Futsal World Cup Golden Glove: 2021

References

External links
AE Palma Futsal profile

1992 births
Living people
Sportspeople from Buenos Aires
Argentine men's futsal players
Futsal goalkeepers
Argentine expatriate sportspeople in Spain
Argentine expatriate sportspeople in Brazil